The following lists events that happened during 2017 in South Africa.

Incumbents

National Government 
 President: Jacob Zuma (ANC)
 Deputy President: Cyril Ramaphosa (ANC)
 Leader of the Opposition: Mmusi Maimane
 Chief Justice: Mogoeng Mogoeng
 Deputy Chief Justice:
 Bess Nkabinde (Acting)
 Raymond Zondo (since 7 June 2017)
 President of the Supreme Court of Appeal:
 Lex Mpati
 Mandisa Maya (since 26 May 2017)
 Deputy President of the Supreme Court of Appeal:
 Mandisa Maya
 Vacant (since 26 May 2017)
 Chairperson of the Electoral Court of South Africa: Khayelihle Kenneth Mthiyane
 Speaker of the National Assembly: Baleka Mbete (ANC)
 Chairperson of the National Council of Provinces: Thandi Modise (ANC)

Cabinet 
The Cabinet, together with the President and the Deputy President, forms part of the Executive.

National Assembly

Provincial Premiers 
 Eastern Cape Province: Phumulo Masualle (ANC) 
 Free State Province: Ace Magashule (ANC) 
 Gauteng Province: David Makhura (ANC) 
 KwaZulu-Natal Province: Willies Mchunu (ANC) 
 Limpopo Province: Stanley Mathabatha (ANC) 
 Mpumalanga Province: David Mabuza (ANC) 
 North West Province: Supra Mahumapelo (ANC) 
 Northern Cape Province: Sylvia Lucas (ANC) 
 Western Cape Province: Helen Zille (DA)

Events 
Events that have occurred or will occur in 2017 in South Africa.

January 
18 December 2016 - 10 February 2017 – Sri Lanka cricket team tours South Africa. The series consists of a tour match, three Test matches, three Twenty20 International matches (T20Is) and five One Day International matches (ODIs). The tour starts on 18 December 2016 (with the Tour match), while the series starts on 26 December (with the first Test that is played at St George's Park, Port Elizabeth). The tour ends on 10 February (with the final ODI that is played at SuperSport Park, Centurion). South Africa wins the Test and ODI series, 3-0 and 5-0 respectively, while Sri Lanka win the T20I series 1–2.
1 January – President Jacob Zuma hosts the annual Indlamu dance festival. "The essence of the festival is to mark the beginning of the new year and to promote indigenous culture and heritage."
4 January – Minister Angie Motshekga release the 2016 National Senior Certificate examination results at Vodaworld in Midrand, Gauteng.

February 
February 9 – President Jacob Zuma presented the State of the Nation (SONA2017) to a joint sitting of the two Houses of Parliament (National Assembly and National Council of Provinces) at 19:00. This was his fourth SONA to the joint sitting of Parliament, since being re-elected in May 2014.
February 22 – Finance Minister Pravin Gordhan presented the Budget for 2017–18 to Parliament.

Deaths

January 
January 15
Thandi Klaasen, South African jazz musician, recipient of South Africa's Order of the Baobab (b. 1930/1931)

February 
February 6
Joost van der Westhuizen, South African rugby player, part of South Africa's 1995 World Cup winning squad (b. 1971)

March 
March 18
Joe Mafela, South African artist, and actor (b. 1942)
March 28
Ahmed Kathrada, South African activist and politician (b. 1929)

December 
December 8
Laloo Chiba, South African politician and revolutionary (b. 1930)

References

South Africa
2010s in South Africa
Years of the 21st century in South Africa